Gadarwara Super Thermal Power Station is a coal based thermal power project located at near by Gangai village in  Gadarwara Tehsil in Narsinghpur District in Indian state of Madhya Pradesh. The power plant is one of the coal based power plants of NTPC Limited.

Capacity
Its planned capacity is 3200 MW (4x800 MW). The land for the project is already acquired and the foundation stone for the project was laid in February 2014. NTPC Limited awarded the EPC contract to BHEL for this project. The first unit was synchronized with grid on 30.08.2018 at 05.12 AM IST.

References

External links

 Gadarwara Super Thermal Power Project at SourceWatch

Coal-fired power stations in Madhya Pradesh
Narsinghpur district
2019 establishments in Madhya Pradesh
Energy infrastructure completed in 2019